Vernee Christell Watson-Johnson (née Watson; born September 28, 1949) is an American actress, author, and acting coach. Watson-Johnson is best known for her recurring roles as Vernajean Williams on Welcome Back, Kotter (1975–1979) and as Viola "Vy" Smith on The Fresh Prince of Bel-Air (1990–1996), playing the mother of Will Smith's character. She is often featured in guest or recurring roles as a nurse. She is currently playing Gloria Tyler (the head nurse) on Bob Hearts Abishola.

Early life 
Vernee Christell Watson was born in New York City on September 28, 1949, where she was also raised. She graduated from Cathedral High School and New York University with a major in drama. She began her professional career at age 17 with the Al Fann Theatrical Ensemble in Manhattan and would tour with the group for 5 years.

Career 
Watson-Johnson played Blue's love interest in the 1972 film Trick Baby. She was also a regular cast member of the 1985–1986 situation comedy Foley Square as Denise Willums, the secretary for Alex Harrigan, played by the show's star, Margaret Colin. She played a small role on Sister, Sister as Lisa's (Jackée Harry) best friend Patrice, and as the mayor's secretary, Lucille Banks, on Carter Country. She also had a recurring role as "Birdie" on The Young and the Restless. In 2005, she appeared in the film Christmas with the Kranks. In addition, Watson-Johnson has made appearances in episodes of television shows as The Love Boat, Hill Street Blues, Married... with Children, L.A. Law, Suddenly Susan, Dharma & Greg, The X-Files, ER, Days of Our Lives, Malcolm in the Middle, CSI: Crime Scene Investigation, Desperate Housewives, Ghost Whisperer, Benson, The Big Bang Theory, Good Times, Dexter, Two and a Half Men, Southland, Criminal Minds, A.N.T. Farm, What's Happening!!, Young Sheldon, Jessie, Mike and Molly, and several other series.

Beginning in the mid-1970s, Watson-Johnson appeared in several TV commercials for various national brands, including McDonald's, Polaroid, Kellogg's, Pillsbury, Lysol, IBM and Procter & Gamble.

As a voice actress, she has been tied to Hanna-Barbera Productions and Warner Bros. Animation with roles in shows such as Captain Caveman and the Teen Angels, Laff-A-Lympics, A Pup Named Scooby-Doo,  Animaniacs, Batman: The Animated Series, Superman: The Animated Series and Batman Beyond, as well as the feature film The Ant Bully, and several video games related to these productions. From 1991 to 1992, she lent her voice to the show Baby Talk, where she was the voice of baby Danielle (played by Alicia and Celicia Johnson). In 2006, Watson-Johnson had roles in three films: The Ant Bully, The Celestine Prophecy and Garfield: A Tale of Two Kitties. In 2017, Watson-Johnson was cast as Stella Henry on the soap opera General Hospital, aunt of Donnell Turner's character Curtis Ashford. She won two Daytime Emmy Award for Outstanding Special Guest Performer in a Drama Series for the role in 2018 and 2019.

She guest starred as Janice on Peacock's dramatic Fresh Prince reimagining Bel-Air in its ninth episode.

Personal life 
Watson-Johnson has been married twice. Her first marriage was to Joe Duckett from 1976 until 1977, and was last married to photographer Van Johnson from 1979 to 1991. Watson-Johnson has a daughter named Sunde Jinia Johnson (b. 1983) and a son named Josh (b. 1987) with Johnson. In 2005, Watson-Johnson was a witness in Michael Jackson's child molestation trial.

Filmography

Film

Television

Video games

Awards and nominations

References

External links 

1949 births
Living people
Actresses from New York City
African-American actresses
American film actresses
American television actresses
American video game actresses
American voice actresses
Daytime Emmy Award for Outstanding Guest Performer in a Drama Series winners
Daytime Emmy Award for Outstanding Supporting Actress in a Drama Series winners
Daytime Emmy Award winners
20th-century American actresses
21st-century American actresses
20th-century African-American women
20th-century African-American people
21st-century African-American women